Goodwick United are a Welsh football club from Goodwick, Pembrokeshire in the southwest of Wales. They currently play in the Pembrokeshire League Division One.

Honours

 Pembrokeshire League Division One  - Champions (4): 1950–51; 1977–78; 1993–94; 2015–16, 
 Pembrokeshire League Division One  - Runners-Up (10): 1953–54; 1984–85; 1992–93; 1998–99; 1999–2000; 2000–01; 2002–03; 2013–14; 2017–18, 2021–22
 Pembrokeshire League Division Two  - Runners-Up (1): 1963–64
 Pembrokeshire League Division Four – Champions (1): 2008–09 (second team)
 Pembrokeshire League Division Three  - Runners-Up (1): 2009–10 (second team)
 Pembrokeshire League Division Four – Runners-Up (1): 1970–71 (second team)
 Pembrokeshire League Reserves Division One – Runners-Up (1): 1994–95
 Pembrokeshire Senior Cup – Winners (6): 1951–52; 1954–55; 1998–99; 2009–10; 2014–15; 2015–16
 Pembrokeshire Senior Cup – Runners-Up (5): 1980–81; 1983–84; 1986–87; 1995–96; 1996–97
 West Wales Amateur Cup/ Intermediate Challenge Cup – Champions: 1949–50; 2015–16; 2017–18
 West Wales Intermediate Challenge Cup – Runners-Up: 1999–2000

References

External links
Official club Facebook
Official club Twitter

Football clubs in Wales
Sport in Pembrokeshire
Pembrokeshire League clubs